Pete Tex (born as Peter Drischel) is a German easy listening and pop saxophonist, composer and session musician.

In 1974 Pete Tex recorded his first solo single. He launched his career with the hit called Slow motion.

Discography

Albums 
 1975 - Plays Golden Saxophone Hits
 1998 - Golden Sax Dreams

Singles 
 1975 - Tuff
 1976 - Sexy Sax
 1980 - Midnight Sax
 1999 - Pas de Deux

Compilations 
 1976 - Golden top Hits

References

External links 
 
 Discogs profile

Living people
German saxophonists
Male saxophonists
German composers
21st-century saxophonists
21st-century German male musicians
Year of birth missing (living people)